OK K.O.! Let's Be Heroes (also known simply as OK K.O.!) is an American superhero comedy animated series created by Ian Jones-Quartey (known for his work on Adventure Time, Steven Universe, Secret Mountain Fort Awesome, and nockFORCE) and based on his pilot short Lakewood Plaza Turbo, which was released as part of Cartoon Network's 2013 Summer Shorts project. On December 7, 2017, show creator Ian Jones-Quartey confirmed via Twitter that a second season had been greenlit. The show was renewed for a third season in 2019, and it was confirmed that it would be the series' last following the show's cancellation.

The series concluded on September 6, 2019, after three seasons and 112 episodes.

Series overview

Episodes 
Note: The order of the episodes are presented by the intended order list specified by executive producer Toby Jones and were listed accordingly on HBO Max. This does not reflect the order in which they initially aired.

Pilot (2013)

Season 1 (2017–18) 
K.O. is voiced by Stephanie Nadolny in episodes 4, 5, 6, 8, and 12, and by Courtenay Taylor in the rest of the season.

Season 2 (2018–19)

Season 3 (2019)

Shorts

Precursor shorts (2016–17)
Note: K.O. is voiced by Stephanie Nadolny. Each short episode is animated by different animation studios, such as Science SARU and Yotta. Most of the shorts could only be watched using the Cartoon Network app.

Home media

Notes

References 

Lists of American children's animated television series episodes
Lists of American comedy television series episodes
2010s television-related lists